Idhaya Kamalam is a 1965 Indian Tamil-language thriller film, directed by Srikanth, written by Aaroor Dass and produced by L. V. Prasad. A remake of the Marathi film Pathlaag (1964), it stars K. R. Vijaya and Ravichandran. The film was released on 27 August 1965 and became a success.

Plot 

Kamala and Vimala are twin sisters. While Kamala leads a normal life and is married to a lawyer studying in London, Vimala joins a band of robbers. Kamala's husband returns home to find his wife terminally ill.

Cast 

Female cast
 K. R. Vijaya as Kamala and Vimala
 Sheeladevi as Geetha
 R. Rukmani as Bhaskar's mother

Male cast
 Ravichandran as Bhaskar
 T. S. Balaiah as Bhaskar's uncle
 S. V. Sahasranamam as the judge
 R. S. Manohar as the public prosecutor
 Balaji as the police inspector

Production 
Idhaya Kamalam, a remake of the Marathi film Pathlaag (1964), was directed by Srikanth and produced by L. V. Prasad under Prasad Productions. The screenplay was written by Aaroor Dass, cinematography was handled by K. S. Prasad, editing by P. V. Manickam and art direction by Thota. L. V. Prasad also served as supervising director. The film was colourised using Eastmancolor.

Soundtrack 
The soundtrack album was composed by K. V. Mahadevan while the lyrics were written by Kannadasan.

Release and reception 
Idhaya Kamalam was released on 27 August 1965, and distributed by Prasad Productions in Madras. T. M. Ramachandran of Sport and Pastime called it "noteworthy film", appreciating K. R. Vijaya calling "The best performance in the film [..] she displays mark her out as a fine actress", he also praised K. V. Mahadevan's music, calling it "lilting" and "one of the important assets of the film" and also calling K. S. Prasad's camerawork "praiseworthy". Kalki lauded Prasad's cinematography, Vijaya's dual performance and Srikanth's direction, but felt Ravichandran did not do well enough. The film was a major success; according to historian Randor Guy, this was because of the music and Vijaya's performance.

References

External links 
 

1960s Tamil-language films
1960s thriller films
1965 films
Films scored by K. V. Mahadevan
Indian thriller films
Tamil remakes of Marathi films
Twins in Indian films